KQCR refers to the following broadcasting stations in the United States:

KQCR-FM, a radio station on 98.9 MHz licensed to Parkersburg, Iowa
KZIA, an FM radio station on 102.9 MHz licensed to Cedar Rapids, Iowa, which held the call sign KQCR from 1975 to 1995